James Stewart House may refer to:

James Stewart Jr. House, Christina, Delaware, listed on the NRHP in New Castle County, Delaware
James Stewart House (Glasgow, Delaware), listed on the NRHP in New Castle County, Delaware
Dr. James A. Stewart House, Portal, Georgia, listed on the NRHP in Bulloch County, Georgia
James Stewart House (Lexington, South Carolina), listed on the NRHP, in Lexington County
Dr. James M. and Dove Stewart House, Katy, Texas, listed on the NRHP in Harris County, Texas

See also
Stewart House (disambiguation)